Aleksey Vladimirovich Nikanchikov (30 July 1940 – 28 January 1972) was a Soviet fencer. He won a silver medal in the team épée event at the 1968 Summer Olympics.

References

External links
 

1940 births
1972 deaths
Russian male fencers
Soviet male fencers
Olympic fencers of the Soviet Union
Fencers at the 1964 Summer Olympics
Fencers at the 1968 Summer Olympics
Olympic silver medalists for the Soviet Union
Olympic medalists in fencing
Medalists at the 1968 Summer Olympics
Universiade medalists in fencing
Sportspeople from Khabarovsk
Universiade bronze medalists for the Soviet Union